Esther Griffin White, (1869–1954), was an American journalist, poet, politician, and women's rights activist. She was an active members of the women's suffrage movement and in 1920 became the first woman in Indiana to have her name on a state election ballot. White was also the first woman in Indiana to campaign for a seat in the United States House of Representatives.

Early life and education 
White was born in Richmond, Indiana in 1869. Her parents, Oliver White and Mary Caroline Cottom, were Quakers, and her father was a teacher. As a teenager, White attended classes at Earlham College, but never completed her degree.

Career

Journalism 
Throughout her lifetime, White worked as a journalist for several Richmond newspapers including the Richmond Morning News and the Palladium-Item, and was a member of the Indiana Women's Press Club. White also founded her own newspaper, which she titled The Little Paper. The paper was reportedly written and published entirely by White.

Articles by White were published in magazines such as House Beautiful, American Art News, Woman's Home Companion, and Brush and Pencil.

Activism 
White was a vocal advocate for women's suffrage. She was a member of several suffragist organizations, including the Richmond Franchise League, the Women's Franchise League of Indiana (the local affiliate of the National American Woman Suffrage Association).

White was also a strong advocate for racial equality, and was an active member of the Richmond Branch of the National Association for the Advancement of Colored People (NAACP).

Politics 
In 1912, White voiced her support for Theodore Roosevelt's presidential campaign.

In 1920, before the passage of the 19th amendment recognized women's right to vote in the United States, White campaigned to become a Delegate to the Republican State Convention, making her the first woman in Indiana to have her name appear on a state election ballot. White was elected to the office and served as the only female delegate at the convention.

Later, White ran for both mayoral and congressional office, though she was not elected to either post.

Poetry and art 
In addition to being a journalist and activist, White was also a poet and a patron of the arts. Her collection of paintings by Indiana artists was donated to Earlham College.

White published four books of poetry as well as a volume on bookplates from Indiana titled Indiana Bookplates (1910).

Death and legacy 
White died in 1954 and was buried in the Earlham Cemetery in Richmond.

In 1992, White was inducted into the Indiana Journalism Hall of Fame at Depaw University.

Sources 

American women journalists
American suffragists
20th-century American women writers
20th-century American women politicians
People from Richmond, Indiana